Leo van der Pluym (born 10 February 1935) is a Dutch former professional racing cyclist. He rode in two editions of the Tour de France.

References

External links
 

1935 births
Living people
Dutch male cyclists
People from Dussen
Cyclists from North Brabant